The Secret Footballer is the pseudonym of a former Premier League footballer who contributes articles to The Guardian newspaper and has written five books, I Am The Secret Footballer, Tales From The Secret Footballer, The Secret Footballer's Guide to the Modern Game, The Secret Footballer: Access All Areas, and How to Win: Lessons from the Premier League.

The Secret Footballer is English, has played for at least two Premier League clubs and was once relegated on the last day of the season. He grew up on a rural council estate and was a late starter in organised football and signed his first professional contract aged 21. He was still playing as late as 2011.

He says that he considered suicide after the end of his career but his writing steered him away from alcohol abuse. The Secret Footballer wants to reveal his identity but fears being sued for the content of his work.

Bibliography
The Secret Footballer: Access All Areas (Guardian Faber, 2015)
The Secret Footballer's Guide to the Modern Game: Tips and Tactics from the Ultimate Insider (Guardian Faber, 2014)
Tales From The Secret Footballer (Guardian Faber, 2013)
I Am The Secret Footballer: Lifting the Lid on the Beautiful Game (Guardian Faber, 2012)
How to Win: Lessons from the Premier League (Guardian Faber, 2017)

References

External links

The Secret Footballer blog on The Guardian
Who Is The Secret Footballer - A website whose large community and many comments speculate on the identity of The Secret Footballer.

English footballers
English non-fiction writers
Pseudonymous writers
The Guardian journalists
British memoirists
Association footballers not categorized by position

Living people
Year of birth missing (living people)